Eskdale was a parliamentary constituency centred on the Eskdale,  district of north Cumberland not to be confused with the valley of Eskdale in the west of the county.  It returned one Member of Parliament (MP) to the House of Commons of the Parliament of the United Kingdom, elected by the first past the post system.

History
The constituency was created by the Redistribution of Seats Act 1885 for the 1885 general election, and abolished for the 1918 general election.

Boundaries
The Municipal Borough of Carlisle, the Sessional Divisions of Cumberland Ward, Eskdale Ward, and Longtown, and part of the Sessional Division of Allerdale Ward below Derwent.

Members of Parliament

Elections

Elections in the 1880s

Elections in the 1890s

Elections in the 1900s

Elections in the 1910s 

General Election 1914–15:

Another General Election was required to take place before the end of 1915. The political parties had been making preparations for an election to take place and by the July 1914, the following candidates had been selected; 
Unionist: Claude Lowther
Liberal: George Schuster

See also
 Parliamentary Franchise in the United Kingdom 1885-1918

References

Parliamentary constituencies in North West England (historic)
Constituencies of the Parliament of the United Kingdom established in 1885
Constituencies of the Parliament of the United Kingdom disestablished in 1918
History of Cumberland